Diospyros korthalsiana is a tree in the family Ebenaceae. Twigs dry to whitish. Inflorescences bear up to seven flowers. The tree is named for the Dutch botanist P. W. Korthals. Habitat is mixed dipterocarp forests from sea-level to  altitude. D. korthalsiana is found in Borneo, Sulawesi and the Philippines.

References

korthalsiana
Plants described in 1873
Trees of Borneo
Trees of Sulawesi
Trees of the Philippines